Long Eaton RFC are a rugby union club based in Long Eaton, Derbyshire, UK. They play in Midlands 1 East following their promotion from Midlands 2 East (North) as champions at the end of the 2020-21 season with over 100 points.  Prior to that they were 2017-2018 champions of RFU Midlands Division 3 East (North) and 2016-17 champions of RFU Midlands Division 4 East (North) having remained unbeaten for both seasons.  They are also won 2016-17 RFU Junior Vase, narrowly missing out on the national final. The club are currently Director of Rugby is Wasps RFC defence coach Matt Everard, and head coach is former Nottingham RFC players Murray McConnell

The club play their home games on West Park.

History 
The club was formed in 1969 by a group of local people, mainly businessman and school teachers. In the first season only 3 games were played before becoming full members of Derbyshire RFU in 1969. The club soon progressed to running two sides in 1971, and then by 1974 was running four senior sides.

In 1982 the club ran a colts section which lasted three years, and then returned to running four senior sides through until the late nineties when gradually over a number of years the club was resigned to running one side in 2008.. Along with the decrease in playing numbers the club in parallel lost its level of rugby resulting in them languishing in the bottom league of the Notts, Lincs and Derbyshire rugby hierarchy.

The Club has always played its fixtures on West Park, Long Eaton, and from its early days using local pubs and Parkland's Adult Education Centre for a number of years, it is now based in its own leased Clubhouse on West Park. The club has two council owned pitches, one of which is fully floodlit.

The club has peaked and troughed like many local clubs. The two peaks arguably, the mid 70s before league rugby when Long Eaton were one of the top sides in Derbyshire and then mid to late 90s when rising up the leagues and getting to the semi-final of the Three Counties Cup.

Present Day 
In 2015, The club agreed a change in constitution and structure, removing the committee and replacing it with a management team and creating posts and job descriptions more prevalent to modern rugby.

The Club now runs Senior, Ladies, Colts, Junior and Mini Rugby Union. and has the highest approval it can gain from the Rugby Football Union.

The Club is based on West Park where it has a part of the Borough Councils changing room block, approx a third of the building, since 1995. Inside the leased premise, the Club has a communal area with a licensed bar, a kitchen, a Sports Therapy and 6 self-contained changing rooms.

The Club use two council owned pitches one of which is floodlit to match standard, and the club own the floodlights. This pitch is also has a crowd barrier down each side. The Club has a very good relationship with the borough Council, who use the facilities on a regular basis.

The Club has partnerships with Long Eaton, Wilsthorpe, Friesland and Chilwell Secondary Schools. The Club also works with a number of primary schools with Long Eaton and surrounding areas.

In 2014, the chairman Chris Brookes has received several awards. His year of awards started with LERFC Club Man of the Year, soon after he received a 'Service to Sport' award from Wilsthorpe School Long Eaton Closely followed by another 'Service to Sport' award presented by Erewash School Sports Association (ESSA). In July he received an invitation to meet the Prime Minister, David Cameron at a reception at No. 10 to celebrate the work he has done to support the Armed Forces Community through rugby.

in 2015/16 season, the adult playing membership was now just under 100 whilst our youth (Boys and Girls) and minis section stands at just over 200.

The Club has secured two more training pitches on West Park in 2015, with planning permission to install new floodlights to allow training through the winter months and free up the main pitch for matches only.

Club honours 
Notts, Lincs & Derbyshire 1 champions: 1995–96
Midlands 5 East (North) champions: 2010–11
Midlands 4 East (North) champions: 2016–17
RFU Midlands Junior Vase winners: 2016–17
Midlands 3 East (North) champions: 2017–18
Midlands 2 East (North) champions: 2020-21

References

Rugby union in Derbyshire
English rugby union teams
Long Eaton
Rugby clubs established in 1969